Jake Hamilton & the Sound is a Christian praise & worship band from Rancho Cucamonga, California started in 2013. In 2014, the band released their debut studio album with Fuel Music entitled Beautiful Rider that has seen commercial successes and positive criticism.

Music
The band is on the Fuel Music label, and released their first studio album on January 21, 2014 entitled, Beautiful Rider, which saw commercial successes and positive criticism.

Studio work
The band released their first studio album Beautiful Rider on January 21, 2013, and it saw success on the Billboard Christian Albums and Heatseekers Albums charts at Nos. 27 and 13 respectively.

Members
 Jake Hamilton (Guitar & vocals)
 Brian Campbell (Bass) 
 Marc Ford (Guitar)
 Dustin Lau (Keysboard)
 Seth Thomas (Drum)

Discography

Studio albums

References

External links
 

Musical groups from California